Brachmia dimidiella is a moth of the family Gelechiidae. It is found in most of Europe (except Ireland, Great Britain, Portugal, Croatia and Greece), east to Japan.

The wingspan is 10–11 mm. Adults are on wing from June to August.

References

Moths described in 1775
Brachmia
Moths of Asia
Moths of Europe